Ildegarda Taffra (30 June 1934 – 7 December 2020) was an Italian cross-country skier who competed in the 1950s.

Life
She was born in Tarvisio.

Competing in two Winter Olympics, she finished eighth in the 3 × 5 km relay at Cortina d'Ampezzo in 1956. Taffra also competed in the 10 km event at the 1952 Winter Olympics in Oslo, but did not finish. Taffra was a six-time national champion and also earned five podium finishes in her career, including four victories. Like her compatriot Fides Romanin, she would be an inspiration to future women cross country skiers for Italy, including Manuela Di Centa, Stefania Belmondo, and Gabriella Paruzzi.

Taffra died from COVID-19 in Trieste on 7 December 2020, at age 86, during the COVID-19 pandemic in Italy.

Cross-country skiing results

Olympic Games

World Championships

References

External links
 Biography for Ildegarda 

1934 births
2020 deaths
Italian female cross-country skiers
Olympic cross-country skiers of Italy
Cross-country skiers at the 1952 Winter Olympics
Cross-country skiers at the 1956 Winter Olympics
Deaths from the COVID-19 pandemic in Friuli Venezia Giulia